Jennifer Steyn (born 29 October 1961), is a South African actress. She is best known for the roles in the television serials such as; Madam & Eve, Jacob's Cross and Fallen.

Personal life
Steyn was born on 29 October 1961 in Cape Town, South Africa. In 1983, she graduated from University of Cape Town (UCT) with a BA Performer's Diploma in Speech and Drama.

Career
In 2000, she played the role "Tillie de Wet" in the serial Onder Draai die Duiwel Rond. Then she appeared in the serial Soul Buddyz with the role Arlene. In 2001, she joined with e.tv comedy satire Madam & Eve with the role "Marge". After popularity, she reprised her role in the second season as well. In 2005, she acted in the science fiction television series Charlie Jade with the role "Andrea Bridger". In 2006, she made the role "Bodine" in the SABC3 comedy serial Shado's.

In 2007, she appeared in the e.tv sports drama Shooting Stars with the role of "Marjorie Goldstein". In the next year, she made another supportive role of "Gloria" in the third season of M-Net drama Jacob's Cross. One of her major role in television came through the SABC1 comedy series Abo Mzala, where she played the role of "Mrs Fleming". She continued to play the role for three consecutive years until conclusion of third season in 2018. In the meantime, she got the opportunity to appear in the SABC1 drama serial Fallen with the role "Deborah Churchill".

Apart from them, she also appeared in numerous television serials and soapies such as; End of the Road, Jozi Streets, Justice for All, Jozi-H, The Human Family, The Principal, The Big Time, Clean Hands and Natural Rhythm. In the meantime, she made several notable appearances in the films across many genre such as: Cry the Beloved Country, Master Harold and the Boys, Gums and Noses, Goodbye Bafana, Red Dust, The Lovers, Merlin: The Return, Glory Glory, Pure Blood, Borderline, Duma, Free Fall, Windprints, Zimbabwe, Night Drive and Black Butterflies. In 2005, she acted in the Hollywood blockbuster adventure film Duma directed by Carroll Ballard. In 2007, Steyn was nominated for the Best Actress Award for her role in the film Goodbye Bafana at the South African Film and Television Awards. (SAFTA).

Apart from cinema and television, she performed in the South African theatre plays: The Fall of the House of Usher, Under Milkwood, Angels in America, Anthony and Cleopatra, Macbeth, King Lear, The Woman Who Cooked Her Husband, Old Boys and Green Man Fishing. For her role in the play Green Man Flashing, she was nominated for the Fleur du Cap for Best Actress and later for Dalro awards. Meanwhile, she also won the Fleur du Cap award for Best Actress for her role in British television play Blue Remembered Hills. As a voice-over artist, she rendered her voice for many television commercials for the brands; BMW, Exclusive Books, Landrover, Stuttafords, MTN, FNB, Liberty life, Staysoft, and Edgars. In 2020, at the Fleur de Cap, she was nominated for Best Actress for The Goat or who is Sylvia and Best Supporting Actress for Aunty Merle it’s a Girl.

Filmography

References

External links
 IMDb

1961 births
Living people
South African film actresses
South African television actresses
South African stage actresses
21st-century South African actresses